This is a list of notable events in country music that took place in the year 1995.

Events
 February - Western Flyer releases "Cherokee Highway", a song against interracial violence. While the song does not chart, Martin Luther King Jr.'s widow Coretta Scott King invites the band to perform at his birthday celebration in Atlanta, Georgia.
 June - Ty Herndon is arrested for indecent exposure in Fort Worth, Texas, by an undercover police officer. 
 December 31: Great American Country is launched by the Jones Radio Network. With a heavy emphasis on country music videos, the network is the first major rival to CMT.

Top hits of the year

Singles released by American artists

Singles released by Canadian artists

Top new album releases

{| class="wikitable sortable"
|-
! US
! CAN
! Album
! Artist
! Record Label
|-
| align="center"| 27
| align="center"| 7
| 4 Runner
| 4 Runner
| Polydor Nashville
|-
| align="center"| 1
| align="center"| 1
| All I Want
| Tim McGraw
| Curb
|-
| align="center"| 25
| align="center"| 21
| All of This Love
| Pam Tillis
| Arista Nashville
|-
| align="center"| 13
| align="center"| 5
| Come Together: America Salutes The Beatles
| Various Artists
| Liberty
|-
| align="center"| 
| align="center"| 3
| Country Heat 5
| Various Artists
| RCA
|-
| align="center"| 8
| align="center"| 4
| Dwight Live
| Dwight Yoakam
| Reprise
|-
| align="center"| 
| align="center"| 6
| Endless Seasons
| The Rankin Family
| EMI
|-
| align="center"| 1
| align="center"| 1
| Fresh Horses
| Garth Brooks
| Liberty
|-
| align="center"| 2
| align="center"| 6
| Games Rednecks Play
| Jeff Foxworthy
| Warner Bros.
|-
| align="center"| 5
| align="center"| 5
| Gone
| Dwight Yoakam
| Reprise
|-
| align="center"| 17
| align="center"| 
| Greatest Hits
| Little Texas
| Warner Bros.
|-
| align="center"| 5
| align="center"| 6
| Greatest Hits
| Lorrie Morgan
| BNA
|-
| align="center"| 5
| align="center"| 7
| Greatest Hits 1990–1995
| Sawyer Brown
| Curb
|-
| align="center"| 3
| align="center"| 17
| Greatest Hits: From the Beginning
| Travis Tritt
| Warner Bros.
|-
| align="center"| 1
| align="center"| 1
| The Greatest Hits Collection
| Alan Jackson
| Arista Nashville
|-
| align="center"| 
| align="center"| 22
| Gypsies & Lovers
| The Irish Descendants
| Warner
|-
| align="center"| 12
| align="center"| 
| Have Yourself a Tractors Christmas
| The Tractors
| Arista Nashville
|-
| align="center"| 19
| align="center"| 
| The Hits Chapter 1
| Sammy Kershaw
| Mercury/PolyGram
|-
| align="center"| 14
| align="center"| 
| Hog Wild
| Hank Williams, Jr.
| Curb/Warner Bros.
|-
| align="center"| 10
| align="center"| 
| Hypnotize the Moon
| Clay Walker
| Giant
|-
| align="center"| 5
| align="center"| 13
| I Think About You
| Collin Raye
| Epic
|-
| align="center"| 12
| align="center"| 10
| In Pictures
| Alabama
| RCA Nashville
|-
| align="center"| 4
| align="center"| 2
| It Matters to Me
| Faith Hill
| Warner Bros.
|-
| align="center"| 
| align="center"| 2
| Jason McCoy
| Jason McCoy
| MCA
|-
| align="center"| 22
| align="center"| 4
| Jeff Carson
| Jeff Carson
| Curb
|-
| align="center"| 1
| align="center"| 1
| John Michael Montgomery
| John Michael Montgomery
| Atlantic
|-
| align="center"| 
| align="center"| 8
| Kickin' Country 3
| Various Artists
| Sony
|-
| align="center"| 13
| align="center"| 
| Life Is Good
| Emilio Navaira
| Capitol Nashville
|-
| align="center"| 28
| align="center"| 14
| Life's So Funny
| Joe Diffie
| Epic
|-
| align="center"| 65
| align="center"| 18
| Little Acts of Treason
| Carlene Carter
| Giant
|-
| align="center"| 11
| align="center"| 2
| Lonestar
| Lonestar
| BNA
|-
| align="center"| 
| align="center"| 5
| Long Gone to the Yukon
| Stompin' Tom Connors
| EMI
|-
| align="center"| 25
| align="center"| 
| Looking for Christmas
| Clint Black
| RCA Nashville
|-
| align="center"| 17
| align="center"| 
| Looking for the Light
| Rick Trevino
| Columbia
|-
| align="center"| 6
| align="center"| 15
| Love Lessons
| Tracy Byrd
| MCA Nashville
|-
| align="center"| 
| align="center"| 4
| Lucky Man
| Charlie Major
| Arista
|-
| align="center"| 
| align="center"| 14
| Made for Each Other
| Calvin Wiggett
| Royalty
|-
| align="center"| 24
| align="center"| 
| Mr. Christmas
| Joe Diffie
| Epic
|-
| align="center"| 9
| align="center"| 3
| Music for All Occasions
| The Mavericks
| MCA Nashville
|-
| align="center"| 13
| align="center"| 12
| NASCAR: Runnin' Wide Open
| Various Artists
| Columbia
|-
| align="center"| 
| align="center"| 1
| New Country 2
| Various Artists
| Warner
|-
| align="center"| 2
| align="center"| 1
| Now That I've Found You: A Collection
| Alison Krauss
| Rounder
|-
| align="center"| 
| align="center"| 18
| Nowhere to Here
| Blue Rodeo
| Warner
|-
| align="center"| 21
| align="center"| 
| O Holy Night
| John Berry
| Capitol Nashville
|-
| align="center"| 19
| align="center"| 
| Old Enough to Know Better
| Wade Hayes
| Columbia
|-
| align="center"| 12
| align="center"| 23
| One
| George Jones & Tammy Wynette
| MCA Nashville
|-
| align="center"| 10
| align="center"| 2
| Out with a Bang
| David Lee Murphy
| MCA Nashville
|-
| align="center"| 19
| align="center"| 
| The Redneck Test Volume 43
| Jeff Foxworthy
| Laughing Hyena
|-
| align="center"| 42
| align="center"| 10
| The Road Goes on Forever
| The Highwaymen
| Columbia
|-
| align="center"| 10
| align="center"| 7
| Something Special
| Dolly Parton
| Columbia
|-
| align="center"| 3
| align="center"| 3
| Souvenirs
| Vince Gill
| MCA Nashville
|-
| align="center"| 12
| align="center"| 9
| Standing on the Edge
| John Berry
| Patriot/Liberty
|-
| align="center"| 1
| align="center"| 1
| Starting Over
| Reba McEntire
| MCA Nashville
|-
| align="center"| 9
| align="center"| 7
| Strait Out of the Box
| George Strait
| MCA Nashville
|-
| align="center"| 4
| align="center"| 5
| Strong Enough
| BlackHawk
| Arista Nashville
|-
| align="center"| 13
| align="center"| 2
| Terri Clark
| Terri Clark
| Mercury/PolyGram
|-
| align="center"| 3
| align="center"| 18
| Thinkin' About You
| Trisha Yearwood
| MCA Nashville
|-
| align="center"| 
| align="center"| 1
| This Child
| Susan Aglukark
| EMI
|-
| align="center"| 10
| align="center"| 
| This Thing Called Wantin' and Havin' It All
| Sawyer Brown
| Curb
|-
| align="center"| 45
| align="center"| 23
| A Thousand Memories
| Rhett Akins
| Decca Nashville
|-
| align="center"| 
| align="center"| 4
| Time of My Life
| George Fox
| Warner
|-
| align="center"| 12
| align="center"| 
| Tool Box
| Aaron Tippin
| RCA Nashville
|-
| align="center"| 24
| align="center"| 10
| Tracy Lawrence Live and Unplugged
| Tracy Lawrence
| Atlantic
|-
| align="center"| 13
| align="center"| 30
| Ty England
| Ty England
| RCA Nashville
|-
| align="center"| 
| align="center"| 4
| Untamed and True 2
| Various Artists
| MCA
|-
| align="center"| 9
| align="center"| 3
| What Mattered Most
| Ty Herndon
| Epic
|-
| align="center"| 
| align="center"| 3
| ''The Wheel Keeps on Rollin| Asleep at the Wheel
| Capitol Nashville
|-
| align="center"| 21
| align="center"| 
| When and Where
| Confederate Railroad
| Atlantic
|-
| align="center"| 17
| align="center"| 4
| Wild Angels
| Martina McBride
| RCA Nashville
|-
| align="center"| 24
| align="center"| 11
| Wings
| Mark Chesnutt
| Decca Nashville
|-
| align="center"| 1
| align="center"| 1
| The Woman in Me
| Shania Twain
| Mercury/PolyGram
|-
| align="center"| 
| align="center"| 19
| Work of the Heart
| Quartette
| Denon
|-
| align="center"| 10
| align="center"| 
| You Gotta Love That
| Neal McCoy
| Atlantic
|-
| align="center"| 7
| align="center"| 13
| You Have the Right to Remain Silent
| Perfect Stranger
| Curb
|}

Other top albums

Births
 July 7 — Taylor Kerr, member of Maddie & Tae.
 August 11 – Priscilla Block, 2020s country singer-songwriter ("Just About Over You").
 September 18 — Maddie Font, member of Maddie & Tae.

Deaths
 May 25 – Dick Curless, 63, best known for his hit "A Tombstone Every Mile" (stomach cancer)
 July 25 — Charlie Rich, 62, Grammy Award winning singer and songwriter ("Behind Closed Doors", The Most Beautiful Girl") (pulmonary embolism)
 November 10 — Curly Fox, 85, fiddler and one half of country-comedy duo Curly Fox and Texas Ruby.

Hall of Fame inductees

Bluegrass Music Hall of Fame inductees
Jimmy Martin

Country Music Hall of Fame inductees
Roger Miller (1936–1992)
Jo Walker-Meador (born 1924)

Canadian Country Music Hall of Fame inductees
Gene MacLellan
Stan Klees

Major awards

Grammy AwardsBest Female Country Vocal Performance — "Baby, Now That I've Found You", Alison KraussBest Male Country Vocal Performance — "Go Rest High on That Mountain", Vince GillBest Country Performance by a Duo or Group with Vocal — "Here Comes the Rain", The MavericksBest Country Collaboration with Vocals — "Somewhere in the Vicinity of the Heart", Shenandoah and Alison KraussBest Country Instrumental Performance — "Hightower," Asleep at the Wheel, Béla Fleck and Johnny GimbleBest Country Song — "Go Rest High on That Mountain", Vince GillBest Country Album — The Woman in Me, Shania Twain (Producer: Robert John "Mutt" Lange)Best Bluegrass Album — Unleashed, The Nashville Bluegrass Band

Juno AwardsCountry Male Vocalist of the Year — Charlie MajorCountry Female Vocalist of the Year — Shania TwainCountry Group or Duo of the Year — Prairie Oyster

Academy of Country MusicEntertainer of the Year — Brooks & DunnSong of the Year — "The Keeper of the Stars", Dickey Lee, Karen Staley, Danny Mayo (Performer: Tracy Byrd)Single of the Year — "Check Yes or No", George StraitAlbum of the Year — The Woman in Me (Shania Twain)Top Male Vocalist — Alan JacksonTop Female Vocalist — Patty LovelessTop Vocal Duo — Brooks & DunnTop Vocal Group — The MavericksTop New Male Vocalist — Bryan WhiteTop New Female Vocalist — Shania TwainTop New Vocal Duo or Group — LonestarVideo of the Year — "The Car" – Jeff Carson (Director: Michael Salomon)

 ARIA Awards 
(presented in Sydney on October 20, 1995)Best Country Album - Beyond the Dancing (Troy Cassar-Daley)

Canadian Country Music AssociationBud Country Fans' Choice Award — Michelle WrightMale Artist of the Year — Charlie MajorFemale Artist of the Year — Shania TwainGroup or Duo of the Year — Prairie OysterSOCAN Song of the Year — "Whose Bed Have Your Boots Been Under?", Shania TwainSingle of the Year — "Any Man of Mine", Shania TwainAlbum of the Year — The Woman in Me, Shania TwainTop Selling Album — The Hits, Garth BrooksVideo of the Year — "Any Man of Mine", Shania TwainVista Rising Star Award — Farmer's DaughterVocal Collaboration of the Year — Jim Witter and Cassandra Vasik

Country Music AssociationEntertainer of the Year — Alan JacksonSong of the Year — "Independence Day", Gretchen Peters (Performer: Martina McBride)Single of the Year — "When You Say Nothing at All", Alison Krauss & Union StationAlbum of the Year — When Fallen Angels Fly, Patty LovelessMale Vocalist of the Year — Vince GillFemale Vocalist of the Year — Alison KraussVocal Duo of the Year — Brooks & DunnVocal Group of the Year — The MavericksHorizon Award — Alison KraussMusic Video of the Year — "Baby Likes to Rock It", The Tractors (Director: Michael Salomon)Vocal Event of the Year — "Somewhere in the Vicinity of the Heart", Shenandoah and Alison KraussMusician of the Year — Mark O'Connor

RPM Big Country AwardsCanadian Country Artist of the Year — Charlie MajorBest Country Album —  Only One Moon, Prairie OysterBest Country Single —  "Such a Lonely One", Prairie OysterMale Artist of the Year — Charlie MajorFemale Artist of the Year — Michelle WrightGroup of the Year — Prairie OysterOutstanding New Artist — Shania TwainTop Country Composer(s)''' — Jim Witter and Johnny Douglas

Further reading
Kingsbury, Paul, "The Grand Ole Opry: History of Country Music. 70 Years of the Songs, the Stars and the Stories," Villard Books, Random House; Opryland USA, 1995
Whitburn, Joel, "Top Country Songs 1944–2005 – 6th Edition." 2005.

References

Other links
Country Music Association
Inductees of the Country Music Hall of Fame

External links
Country Music Hall of Fame

Country
Country music by year